William Herbert Kyme (4 December 1891 – 19 November 1975) was an Australian rules footballer who played with Essendon in the Victorian Football League (VFL).

Notes

External links 
		

1891 births
1975 deaths
Australian rules footballers from Victoria (Australia)
Essendon Football Club players
Echuca Football Club players